The Halangy Down transmitter on St Mary's, Isles of Scilly is a 500-watt FM radio and television transmitter with a  high steel lattice tower, surmounted by a main TV antenna.

It is owned and operated by Arqiva. It is fed by the Redruth transmitting station and provides television and FM radio coverage for the Isles of Scilly. Two  dishes on the tower were installed in 2009 to support the switchover to Digital Television.

See also
List of masts
List of tallest buildings and structures in Great Britain

References

External links
 The Transmission Gallery: Isles of Scilly Transmitting Station photographs, coverage maps and information

Radio masts and towers in Europe
Transmitter sites in England
Buildings and structures in the Isles of Scilly
St Mary's, Isles of Scilly